Campbell Joseph O'Connor Kelly, was an intelligence officer in the British Army who was part of the "Cairo Gang" which was targeted for assassination on 21 November 1920 by the Irish Republican Army as one of the events planned by Michael Collins for Bloody Sunday. Kelly's medals were scheduled to be sold at auction in New York in January 2016 in a sale devoted to medals of the 1916 Easter Rising and the fight for Irish independence.

Kelly was awarded the George Medal for his actions working in Air Raid Protection in World War II:

Campbell Joseph Kelly, O.B.E., M.C, M.M., Control Officer, Works Air Defence Department, Coventry. Mr. Kelly's organisation and personal bearing have been largely responsible for the building up of a highly efficient Works Air Raid Defence team. His personal activities on the night of an intensive air raid were largely instrumental in saving his factory from destruction. He extinguished an incendiary bomb and immediately afterwards took twelve volunteers to help the City Fire Service deal with a serious fire. After that, they attended at another fire and on the way back helped to extricate the bodies of policemen who were trapped in debris left by high explosive bombs. A large high explosive bomb hit a works shop but fire was avoided by prompt action under Kelly's guidance. Until five o'clock in the morning Kelly continued to give inspiring leadership to his men. There was no cover for any of the working parties and they all carried out what was asked of them with fortitude and courage. Mr. Kelly was ably assisted in this work by David Lloyd, First Officer of the Works Auxiliary Fire Service

References 

British Army officers
Members of the Order of the British Empire
Recipients of the Military Cross
Recipients of the George Medal
Recipients of the Military Medal
Year of birth missing
Year of death missing
British military personnel of the Irish War of Independence
People from County Mayo
Royal Garrison Artillery soldiers
Royal Artillery officers
Civil Defence Service personnel
Recipients of the Croix de Guerre 1914–1918 (France)